Humac may refer to:

In Bosnia and Herzegovina 
 Humac, Bugojno, a village in Bosnia and Herzegovina
 Humac, Gornji Vakuf-Uskoplje, a village in Bosnia and Herzegovina
 Humac, Ljubuški, a village in Bosnia and Herzegovina

In Croatia 
 Donji Humac, a village on the island of Brač in Croatia
 Gornji Humac, a village on the island of Brač in Croatia
 Humac, Hvar, a hamlet on the island of Hvar in Croatia